Jhamatpur is a village in Ketugram II CD block in Katwa subdivision of Purba Bardhaman district, West Bengal, India

Geography
It is near Ketugram, 4 km east of Jhamatpur-Baharanpur, 157 km north from Howrah Station, on the B.A.K. loop of the Eastern Railway. This is about 14 km north of Katwa. Jhamatpur Baharan railway station serves nearby areas.

Demographics
As per the 2011 Census of India Jhamatpur had a total population of 1,543, of which 794 (51%) were males and 749 (49%) were females. Population below 6 years was 154. The total number of literates in Jhamatpur was 931 (67.03% of the population over 6 years).

Culture
The village is famous as the birthplace of Krishnadasa Kaviraja, the author of the Chaitanya Charitamrita, a biography of the mystic and saint Chaitanya Mahaprabhu.

The Vaishnav tradition is still maintained by different socio-cultural programs throughout the year, specially the famous Nama-kirtana accompanying feast for several days after Durgapuja.

References

Villages in Purba Bardhaman district